Amorbia exsectana is a species of moth of the family Tortricidae. It is found from Brazil to Panama, where it is found at altitudes between 1,000 and 1,500 meters.

The length of the forewings is 8.8–9.2 mm for males and 10–11 mm for females. The ground colour of the forewings is light brown, the basal, median and subterminal fasciae are dark brown. The hindwings are cream. Adults have been recorded on wing in January, May, June and October.

References

Moths described in 1877
Sparganothini
Moths of South America